Shawna Trpcic (née Shawna Leavell, born October 18, 1966 in Artesia, California)
is a Hollywood costume designer.

Biography
She got her start in the industry with the 1990 film Megaville, and went on to work as a wardrobe assistant on the films Toys and Red Shoe Diaries. She later served as the main costume designer on Joss Whedon's Firefly, Angel, Doctor Horrible's Sing-Along Blog and Dollhouse, as well as Marti Noxon's Point Pleasant. She was also the main costume designer for Torchwood: Miracle Day.

In December 2005, Trpcic auctioned off several of the costumes from Firefly that were in her private collection.  Many of those costumes were purchased by fans who later wore them to the 2006 Browncoat Ball in San Francisco. Trpcic attended the ball, along with Jonathan A Logan (who made Mal's original browncoat from Trpcic's design) and posed for a group shot with everyone who was wearing her original costumes. Trpcic altered her own wedding dress to create the ballgown worn by Morena Baccarin (as Inara Serra) in the Firefly episode "Shindig". Trpcic often attempts to add pink flamingos somewhere on her costumes as she considers this to be her signature mark. An example of this is pointed out by Trpcic herself in the audio commentary to "Shindig", where they are visible on the lapel of the character Badger played by Mark Sheppard.

Trpcic has volunteered at Juvenile Hall and teaches art at a men's maximum security state prison in Northern California. She is a Christian.

Her married last name is of Croatian origin.

References

External links
 

American costume designers
1966 births
Living people
People from Artesia, California